Lyady is a hamlet in the Dubrovna District of Vitebsk Region, Belarus adjacent to the Belarus–Russia border.

History 

Lyady was founded in the 17th century. It was located on the road connecting Moscow and Warsaw. It is located near the Mereya River, once the border between Russia and Poland and later between the Russian Soviet Federative Socialist Republic and the Byelorussian Soviet Socialist Republic.

Jewish population 
Lyady used to have a predominantly Jewish population. It was the center of Chabad chasidism for over a decade. The first rebbe Shneur Zalman of Liadi settled there at the invitation of Prince Stanisław Lubomirski, voivode of the town, after his second imprisonment in 1800. He left the town in 1812, fleeing the French Invasion under Napoleon.

After the German occupation of Belarus in the Second World War, the town's Jews were gathered into a ghetto. On April 2, 1942, the Germans and collaborators killed more than 2,000 Jews in the ghetto.

Liberation 
After a six-day battle from October 3–8, 1943, Lyady was cleared of German forces by the reinforced 30th Guards Rifle Division of 10th Guards Army.

References

External links 
 Monument of 1812 war
 "The murder of the Jews of Lyady" during World War II, Yad Vashem website
 

Populated places in Vitebsk Region
Dubrowna District
Orshansky Uyezd
Shtetls
Holocaust locations in Belarus
Jewish communities destroyed in the Holocaust